The  was a planned nuclear power plant in Minamisōma and Namie in the Fukushima Prefecture, Japan.   It was a project of the Tōhoku Electric Power Company. Preliminary ground work had been completed by the time of the 2011 Tōhoku earthquake and tsunami.  The plans were canceled after urging from local lawmakers in the wake of the Fukushima Daiichi nuclear disaster and due to strong local opposition. On January 31, 2017, Tohoku Electric decided to donate the site of about 1.2 million square meters to Namie Town free of charge.

Reactors on site

Unit 1 (not built)
Type: ABWR
Start of construction: 2017
Begin of operation: 2021 (planned)
Electric Output: 825 MW
Fuel: UO2 fuel

References

External links

Tohoku Electric Power Company - Future Plants

Nuclear power stations in Japan
Cancelled nuclear power stations
Buildings and structures in Fukushima Prefecture
Minamisōma
Namie, Fukushima
Fukushima Daiichi nuclear disaster